Cytospora palmarum is a plant pathogen that causes leaf blight on coconut.

References

External links 
 Index Fungorum
 USDA ARS Fungal Database

Fungal plant pathogens and diseases
Coconut palm diseases
Diaporthales